Hoeft & Wessel AG, Hanover, established by the entrepreneurs Michael Hoeft and Rolf Wessel in 1978, is a German IT hardware and software specialist focusing on public transport, parking as well as retail and logistics. Listed on the stock market since 1998, the company today is a medium-sized enterprise with sales revenues of around EUR 80 million and a workforce of more than 400 employees.

Each year around 10 per cent in terms of turnover are invested in the Research & Development division, which sets the pace in the company's technological orientation and employs about a third of the total workforce. The company operating in the business-to-business segment already generates more than 40 per cent of sales revenues abroad. In addition to Europe, the United States is one of the key target regions.

 With its Almex product brand Hoeft & Wessel is a provider of ticketing and telematics systems for public transport and check-in terminals for the airline industry.
The British subsidiary Metric Parking is a provider of car park ticket vending machines and parking space management systems.
With its Skeye product brand Hoeft & Wessel is a manufacturer of mobile terminals and system solutions for retail and logistics as well as point of sale systems.

References

Manufacturing companies based in Hanover
Software companies of Germany